Kee en Janus naar Berlijn is a 1923 Dutch silent film directed by Alex Benno.

Cast
 Adrienne Solser - Kee Mol
 Kees Pruis - Janus Mol

See also
 Kee en Janus naar Parijs (1924)

External links 
 

1923 films
Dutch silent feature films
Dutch black-and-white films
Films directed by Alex Benno